Jon Barinholtz (born December 27, 1982) is an American actor, comedian, and producer based in Los Angeles. He has appeared in film and television, and is best known for the role of Marcus White on the NBC sitcom Superstore.

Personal life
Barinholtz was raised in Chicago to a Jewish family. He has an older brother, Ike Barinholtz, who is also an actor.

In 2022, he had a child who is deaf.

Career
In July 2021, Netflix announced that it has ordered a new adult animated series Chicago Party Aunt. Barinholtz is one of the show's creators and would also serve as an executive producer and voice actor for the series. Also in July 2021, Barinholtz was added to the main cast of the NBC sitcom American Auto, which premiered on December 13, 2021.

Filmography

References

External links
 

Living people
1979 births
Male actors from Chicago
21st-century American male actors
American male film actors
American male television actors
Jewish American male actors
Jewish American male comedians
Comedians from Illinois
21st-century American comedians
21st-century American Jews